Thomas Augustine Hendrick (October 29, 1849 – November 29, 1909) was an American Catholic priest; he became the 22nd Bishop of Cebú, the first American to hold this position.

Life
Thomas Augustine Hendrick was born in Penn Yan, New York on October 29, 1849. He was ordained priest at St. Joseph's Seminary, Troy, New York, June 7, 1873, and spent 29 years in parish work in the Roman Catholic Diocese of Rochester.

When the reorganization of the Catholic Church in the Philippines was undertaken after the Spanish–American War, he was appointed Bishop of Cebú, and consecrated in Rome August 23, 1903. He took possession of his See on March 6, 1904. He died from cholera in Cebu on November 29, 1909, and was buried on the same day at the floor of the left wing of the Cebu Cathedral right beside the tomb of Bishop Romualdo Jimeno de Ballesteros.

References

Catholic Directory

External links and additional sources
 (for Chronology of Bishops)
 (for Chronology of Bishops)
Catholic Encyclopedia article
Catholic Hierarchy page

1849 births
1909 deaths
People from Penn Yan, New York
Saint Joseph's Seminary (Dunwoodie) alumni
American expatriates in the Philippines
20th-century Roman Catholic bishops in the Philippines
Roman Catholic Diocese of Rochester
Deaths from cholera
Catholics from New York (state)
Roman Catholic bishops of Cebu